HDBaseT is a consumer electronic (CE) and commercial connectivity standard for transmission of uncompressed ultra-high-definition video, digital audio, DC power, Ethernet, USB 2.0, and other control communication (such as RS-232 and Consumer IR) over a single category cable (Cat 5e or better) up to 100 m (328 ft) in length, terminated using the same 8P8C modular connectors as used in Ethernet networks. HDBaseT technology is promoted and advanced by the HDBaseT Alliance.

History 
The HDBaseT Alliance was incorporated on June 14, 2010 by Samsung Electronics, Sony Pictures Entertainment, LG Electronics and Valens Semiconductor as the not-for-profit organization to promote the HDBaseT standard originally created by Valens. The HDBaseT 1.0 specification was also finalized in June 2010.
HDBaseT initially dominated in extender products for HDMI technology before later also being embedded in AV devices such as video projectors and AV receivers.
Products utilizing HDBaseT technology were first demonstrated by multiple vendors at the Consumer Electronics Show as early as 2010, and by the HDBaseT Alliance in 2013.

In 2013, the HDBaseT Alliance issued Specification 2.0 to enrich the HDBaseT offering to the pro-AV market and enable a multimedia home connectivity solution. Spec 2.0 maintains all the features of Spec 1.0, but also adds HDBaseT networking, switching, and control-point capabilities such as flexible and fully utilized mesh topology, distributed routing, and end-to-end error handling, enabling multipoint-to-multipoint connectivity and multi-streaming. Spec 2.0 also embeds USB 2.0 signals, enabling the zero-latency distribution of signals such as for touch-screen functionality and keyboard-video-mouse (KVM). HDBaseT 2.0 maintained category cable as the transmission medium, but also added the option for optical fiber for even greater distances and infrastructure cabling adaptability.

In 2014, the IEEE Standards Association announced that it formed a series of P1911 Working groups with the intention of adopting HDBaseT as a new standard. This project ended up being abandoned with it being administratively withdrawn by 2018.

An Internet Protocol (IP) version of HDBaseT was demonstrated in 2017.

The HDBaseT Alliance released specification 3.0 in 2019, doubling the main downstream signal bandwidth to enable support for uncompressed 4K/60 4:4:4 video, and 6.5x the bandwidth on the auxiliary channel. This enables a significant increase to USB 2.0 data rate capabilities, and advancement of Ethernet support from 100Base-T to Gigabit Ethernet.

Features 
HDBaseT is complementary to digital connectivity standards such as HDMI technology. HDBaseT connects and networks commercial, industrial or CE devices such as set-top boxes, media streamers, DVD players, Blu-ray Disc players, personal computers (PCs), video game consoles, and AV receivers to compatible digital audio devices, computer monitors, multi-touch displays, digital televisions, and digital video projectors. 

A primary differentiator with HDBaseT technology is its 5Play feature set. The five features of 5Play vary with each HDBaseT specification, but center around audiovisual (AV) media, Ethernet, USB, Control Signals, and Power-over-HDBaseT (PoH).

AV
Supports uncompressed video to a network of devices or as a point-to-point connection to accurately render gaming graphics and features such as electronic program guides, and does not degrade video quality. Supports TV and PC video formats, including standard, enhanced, high-definition, Ultra-HD (UHD, up to 4K), and 3D video. 

HDBaseT 1.0 and 2.0 can support uncompressed video up to (750 MByte/s):
 4K at 30 Hz with 8-bit 4:4:4 color coding, 
 4K at 30 Hz with up to 12-bit 4:2:2 and high dynamic range (HDR), 
 4K at 30 Hz with Dolby Vision standard mode,
 4K at 60 Hz with 8-bit 4:2:0 color coding. 

HDBaseT 3.0 can support uncompressed video up to (1500 MByte/s):
 4K at 60 Hz with 8-bit 4:4:4 color coding, 
 4K at 60 Hz with up to 12-bit 4:2:2 and high dynamic range (HDR), 
 4K at 60 Hz with Dolby Vision standard mode.  

Audio is embedded with the video in HDMI, so all standard HDMI audio formats are supported. This includes up to 32 channels of high-resolution 24-bit 192 kHz audio, either compressed or uncompressed, or 2-channel audio with a sampling frequency up to 1536 kHz. HDBaseT 2.0 introduced additional support for separate bi-directional S/PDIF audio, the upstream channel of which can optionally be used to carry HDMI Audio Return Channel, a feature introduced with the HDMI 1.4 specification. The bandwidth increase with HDBaseT 3.0 enables it to optionally support HDMI enhanced Audio Return Channel (eARC), for all of the same audio formats upstream as what is already available in the main HDMI downstream signal, including immersive/object-based audio such as Dolby Atmos or DTS:X.

Near zero latency
The specification allows for negligible latency: less than 100 μs over 100 m of cable. As a point of comparison, a 60 Hz refresh rate means a full image is displayed after 16.67 ms. Adding 0.1 ms is only a 0.6% increase in the signal latency.

Ethernet
HDBaseT 1.0 and 2.0 supports the 100 Mbit/s version of Ethernet over twisted pair. This can provide Internet access to devices such as smart TVs, or enable computers and other CE devices to communicate with each other and access multimedia content on the local network. HDBaseT 3.0 increases this capability to 1000 Base-T (Gigabit) Ethernet.

USB 
HDBaseT 2.0 introduced support for USB 2.0, with a capacity for the simultaneous connection of up to 7 USB devices and a transfer rate up to 190 Mb/s. HDBaseT 3.0 increases this to 350 Mb/s.

Control signals

HDBaseT delivers HDMI Consumer Electronics Control (CEC) protocol signals that control basic functionality such as power-on, power-off and play/stop, along with RS-232 and consumer IR (remote control) commands.

Power 
HDBaseT can provide a variation of Power-over-Ethernet (PoE) standard called power-over-HDBaseT (PoH). This can provision up to 100 W of operating DC power to CE devices, such as monitors and TVs. In practice, if a display (typically up to 60" in size) is enabled as a 100W powered device (PD), and is connected to a matching PoH transmitter (power sourcing equipment, PSE), the display will be able to draw its operating power through the HDBaseT link and not require a separate power connection.

HDBaseT Versions

Specification 1.0 
HDBaseT 1.0 utilizes 16-level Pulse Amplitude Modulation (PAM-16) encoding for downstream data at a rate of 500 MSymbols/s, achieving an aggregate data rate of 8000 MBit/s on 4 lanes. This is equivalent to the 8160 MBit/s of HDMI 1.3/1.4. The HDBaseT auxiliary channel operates with PAM-8 encoding at a rate of 12.5 MSymbols/s for an aggregate 150 MBit/s. 

The 5Play feature set of HDBaseT 1.0 delivers video, audio, Ethernet, control signals, and power over a single connection. It does not support USB. 

The minimum compatible cable type is Cat 5e, although Cat 6 is recommended. Termination is 8P8C modular connectors.

Specification 2.0 
HDBaseT 2.0 maintains PAM16 encoding and an aggregate data rate of 8 Gbit/s. However, the auxiliary channel rate was doubled to 25 M symbols/sec for an aggregate 300 Mbit/s. The increased rate predominantly supports USB 2.0 and separate S/PDIF audio. Additionally, version 2.0 specifies the HDBaseT network protocol, defining the required adaptations across all layers of the OSI model, to provide the optimized services for time-sensitive applications such as high throughput video and audio. 

This can be increased to 100 m for UHD 4K by using Cat 6A cable or better.

Specification 3.0 
HDBaseT 3.0 also maintains PAM16 encoding, but doubles the rate to 1000 M symbols/sec for an aggregate data rate of 16 Gb/s. This is equivalent to 18 Gb/s in HDMI transmission: the ceiling of the HDMI 2.0 specification. Furthermore, the auxiliary channel is also upgraded to PAM16 (from PAM8), and rate increased to 125 M symbols/sec for an aggregate 2 Gb/s. This extra upstream data rate capability enables Gigabit Ethernet support, and increases USB 2.0 speed to 350 Mb/s.

The 5Play feature set of HDBaseT 3.0 is carried over from HDBaseT 2.0, albeit with enhanced capabilities.

Cabling for HDBaseT 3.0 requires the use of Cat 6A or better, terminated with 8P8C connectors.

See also 
 
 Digital Interface for Video and Audio (DiiVA) – Bi-directional audio/video at 13.5 Gbit/s over Cat6A
 DisplayPort – Audio/video interface at 17.28 Gbit/s

References

External links
HDBaseT Alliance

Film and video technology
Television technology
Television transmission standards
Video signal